Dinesh J. Sharma (born in New Delhi, India) is an American social scientist, psychologist, academic and entrepreneur in the fields of human development and rights, leadership and globalization; his recent publications include, “The Global Obama: Crossroads of Leadership in the 21st Century” and most recently “The Global Hillary: Women's Political Leadership in Cultural Context."

Currently, he is Director and Chief Research Officer at Steam Works Studio, an education technology venture in Princeton, New Jersey, and works with K-12 populations in private and public schools. He is also a contributing faculty member at Fordham University, New York University, and Walden University, where he teaches and advises students; he has served as an Associate Professor (Adjunct) in Human Rights, Political Science and Psychology at John Jay College, New York City; Cross-Cultural Consultant at Fordham University's Institute for Research, Service, and Teaching (FIRST), founded by Professor Harold Takooshian; and a Senior Fellow at Institute for International and Cross-Cultural Psychology at St. Francis College, New York.

Career
Sharma graduated in 1996 with a Doctorate from Harvard University in Human Development and Psychology, with training in Psychological and Cultural Anthropology.  He has recently edited a book of collected essays on Robert A. LeVine's life's work, the Cultural Psyche, with contributions from leading psychological anthropologists (including Byron J. Good, Richard Shweder, Thomas S. Weisner, and Parker Shipton).

He was on a NIMH Post-Doctoral Fellowship in 1999 at Columbia University and then worked in the private sector for more than a decade. Prior to his time at Harvard, he received his Bachelor of Arts in psychology, Pre-Medicine and Philosophy (1986) and Master of Arts in Clinical Psychology from Loyola University in Chicago, IL (1990).

Sharma has served since 2003 as a senior fellow at the Institute for International and Cross-Cultural Psychology founded by Uwe Gielen at St. Francis College in New York City. He was an Associate Research Professor (Hon.) at the Institute of Global Cultural Studies founded by Ali Mazrui, SUNY Binghamton, where Sharma taught in the Department of Psychology; Politics, Philosophy and Law; and Human Development at Harpur College.  Sharma has also taught courses as adjunct professor at Fordham University at Lincoln Center entitled, “The UN and Global Leadership” and "EQ and Global Leadership." The courses delved into the intricate consensus process at the United Nations, a part of the organizational leadership program.

Sharma is the author and editor of seven books as well as many journal articles, and was a columnist for Asia Times Online, The Global Intelligence, and contributor to various other websites (e.g., Al Jazeera English). His book: “Barack Obama in Hawaii and Indonesia: The Making of a Global President,” was rated as the Top 10 Black History Book for 2012 by the American Library Association. Sharma has also written frequently for Psychology Today, Eastern Eye, and provided commentary on SABC and NewzroomAfrika.

Sharma has been invited as a lecturer all over the world including Akademy Ke Polisi PTKI in Jakarta, Indonesia (2013) and Indian Society for International Law, New Delhi, India, August 2013, and as a panelist at the International Congress of Psychology in Cape Town, South Africa, in 2012. In 2011, Sharma was invited to lecture with Democrats Abroad through ten countries of the European Union.  In 2011, he also received the medal of honor from the New York Society for Behavioral Research, an award where the honorees are chosen based on colleagues and students’ nominations.

Sharma currently resides in Princeton, New Jersey with his wife, son and daughter; he continues to work in the private sector, while always teaching and writing.  He is presently a board member of the International Council of Psychologists, Psychological Coalition at the UN (PCUN), and Manhattan Psychological Association.

References

Indian psychologists
American people of Indian descent
21st-century American psychologists
American writers
St. Francis College people
Binghamton University faculty
Fordham University faculty
Harvard University alumni
Year of birth missing (living people)
Living people
Indian activists